Kim Jong-seo is a Korean name consisting of the family name Kim and the given name Jong-seo, and may also refer to:

 Kim Jong-seo (general) (1383 – 1453), Korean general
 Kim Jong-seo (musician) (born 1965), South Korean musician